Muhamad Baqiuddin bin Shamsudin (born 14 December 1994) is a Malaysian association footballer who plays as a winger for Malaysia Super League club Sri Pahang.

Career statistics

Club

References

External links
 

1994 births
Living people
Shahzan Muda FC players
Kuantan FA players
PDRM FA players
UKM F.C. players
Sri Pahang FC players
Malaysian footballers
Malaysian people of Malay descent
People from Pahang
Malaysia Super League players
Association football midfielders